Wet from Birth is the fourth studio album by the American band The Faint, released on September 14, 2004.

The U.S. release uses HDCD encoding, but the package is not labeled as HDCD.

Track listing

In popular culture
The instrumental bridge from "How Could I Forget?" is used during a chase scene in the pilot episode of the short-lived NBC drama, The Black Donnellys.
The song "I Disappear" is featured in the video games SSX On Tour and Tony Hawk's American Wasteland.
The song "Birth" is featured in the part of Steve Berra, in the skateboarding video Skate More, by DVS.
The violin solo at the beginning of "Desperate Guys" is the introduction to Niccolò Paganini's Caprice No. 5.
Desperate Guys was also featured in the 2012 Rock & Republic commercial.
The song "Dropkick the Punks" appears in EA's 2007 racing game Need for Speed: ProStreet.
The song "Symptom Finger" appears in Billabong's 'Still Filthy' film.

References

External links
The Faint official website
Saddle Creek Records

2004 albums
The Faint albums
Saddle Creek Records albums
Albums produced by Mike Mogis